Warsaw Voivodeship was a voivodeship of Poland in the years 1919–1939. Its capital and biggest city was Warsaw.

Location and area

In the years 1919–1939, Warsaw Voivodeship covered north-central part of Poland, bordering East Prussia to the north, Pomorze Voivodeship and Łódź Voivodeship to the west, Kielce Voivodeship to the south and both Lublin Voivodeship and Białystok Voivodeship to the east. Its area, after April 1, 1938, was 31 656 km² (see: Territorial changes of Polish Voivodeships on 1 April 1938). The landscape was flat. Forests covered only 11.4% of the area, compared to the national average of 22.2%, as of January 1, 1937.

Population

According to the 1931 Polish census, the population was 2 460 900. Poles made up 88.3% of population, Jews - 9.7% and Germans - 1.6%. The Jews and the Germans preferred to live in the cities and towns, especially in Warsaw itself. In Warsaw, in 1931, only 70.7% of population was Polish, with 28.3% Jews. In the whole Voivodeship, 21.8% of the population was illiterate as of 1931.

Industry

The Voivodeship's biggest industrial center was the city of Warsaw, together with towns in its suburbs (Żyrardów, Pruszków, Piaseczno). Warsaw was one of key centers of Polish industry, with numerous factories of various kinds. It was also the biggest city of the country. The Voivodeship's railroad density was 5.2 km. per 100 km² (with total length of railroads 1 548 km.)l

Cities and administrative divisions

Warsaw Voivodeship in mid-1939 consisted of 22 powiats (counties), 53 cities and towns and 293 villages. The counties were:

 Błonie county (area 1 074 km², pop. 143 900),
 Ciechanów county (area 1 209 km², pop. 78 800),
 Działdowo county (area 842 km², pop. 42 700),
 Garwolin county (area 2 044 km², pop. 175 700),
 Gostynin county (area 1 147 km², pop. 81 600),
 Grójec county (area 1 699 km², pop. 132 400),
 Łomża county (area 2 657 km², pop. 168 200),
 Maków Mazowiecki county (area 1 136 km², pop. 65 600),
 Mińsk Mazowiecki county (area 1 228 km², pop. 111 100),
 Mława county (area 1 486 km², pop. 103 100),
 Ostrołęka county (area 2 281 km², pop. 112 600),
 Ostrów Mazowiecka county (area 1 467 km², pop. 99 800),
 Płock county (area 1 485 km², pop. 128 100),
 Płońsk county (area 1 289 km², pop. 81 400),
 Przasnysz county (area 1 410 km², pop. 69 100),
 Pułtusk county (area 1 527 km², pop. 118 100),
 Radzymin county (area 1 076 km², pop. 97 500),
 Sierpc county (area 1 204 km², pop. 84 900),
 Sochaczew county (area 1 052 km², pop. 75 200),
 Sokołów Podlaski county (area 1 276 km², pop. 83 900),
 Warszawa county (area 1 766 km², pop. 318 500),
 Węgrów county (area 1 301 km², pop. 88 800).

The city of Warsaw, with the area of 141 km² (134 km² of built-up area plus 7 km² of the Vistula river) and population of 1 179 500 (as of 1931) was considered a separate unit, just like any other Voivodeship. It was divided into 4 counties. These were:

 South Warsaw county (area 50 km², pop. 307 100),
 North Warsaw county (area 31 km², pop. 478 200),
 Warsaw-Praga county (area 43 km², pop. 176 100),
 Central Warsaw county (area 10 km², pop. 218 100). It was the smallest and the most densely populated county in Poland in the 1930s. Population density there was 22 415 persons per km².

The biggest cities of the Voivodeship were (population according to the 1931 Polish census):

 Warsaw (pop. 1 179 500),
 Płock (pop. 33 000),
 Żyrardów (pop. 25 100),
 Łomża (pop. 25 000),
 Pruszków (pop. 23 700),
 Mława (pop. 19 600),
 Ostrów Mazowiecka (pop. 17 600),
 Pułtusk (pop. 16 800),
 Grodzisk Mazowiecki (pop. 15 700),
 Otwock (pop. 15 100),
 Ostrołęka (pop. 14 100),
 Wolomin (pop. 14 100),
 Ciechanów (pop. 13 900).

Voivodes
Władysław Sołtan 19 November 1919 – 24 November 1927 
Stanisław Twardo 28 November 1927 – 3 July 1934 
Bronisław Nakoniecznikow-Klukowski 3 July 1934 – 5 February 1938 
Jerzy Paciorkowski 22 January 1938 – September 1939 (acting till 5 February 1938)

See also
Poland's current Masovian and Kuyavian-Pomeranian Voivodeships
Territorial changes of Polish Voivodeships on April 1, 1938

References
 Maly rocznik statystyczny 1939, Nakladem Glownego Urzedu Statystycznego, Warszawa 1939 (Concise Statistical Year-Book of Poland, Warsaw 1939).

 
Former voivodeships of the Second Polish Republic